Martín Bengoa Díez (born 21 November 1994) is a Spanish professional footballer who plays for Greek Super League 2 club Anagennisi Karditsa as a central midfielder.

Club career
Born in Otxandio, Biscay, Basque Country, Bengoa joined Athletic Bilbao's youth setup in 2008, aged 13. He made his debut as a senior with the farm team in the 2012–13 campaign, in Tercera División.

On 26 May 2014, Bengoa was promoted to the reserves in Segunda División B. He contributed with 28 appearances and four goals during the season, as the B-side returned to Segunda División after a 19-year absence.

Bengoa made his professional debut on 16 January 2016, coming on as a second-half substitute for Mikel Vesga in a 0–2 away loss against CD Tenerife. He featured rarely during that campaign, but after they were relegated, he remained with the reserves in the following season, this time playing in most of the matches (34, with five goals).

In May 2017, Bengoa left Athletic after his contract expired, and moved to another reserve team, Deportivo Fabril also in the third division, on 3 July. On 21 August 2018, he signed for fellow league team SD Leioa.

On 19 December 2018, Bengoa signed for CR Al Hoceima in Morocco on a contract until June 2019. He then joined another club in the same country, Moghreb Tétouan on a two-year contract, after rejecting offers from clubs in Morocco and Saudi Arabia.

References

External links

Martín Bengoa at La Prefente

1994 births
Living people
People from Durangaldea
Spanish footballers
Footballers from the Basque Country (autonomous community)
Association football midfielders
Segunda División players
Segunda División B players
Tercera División players
Botola players
CD Basconia footballers
Bilbao Athletic footballers
Deportivo Fabril players
SD Leioa players
Chabab Rif Al Hoceima players
Moghreb Tétouan players
Spanish expatriate footballers
Spanish expatriate sportspeople in Morocco
Expatriate footballers in Morocco
Athletic Bilbao footballers
Sportspeople from Biscay